Rameshwar also known as Rameshwar Wadi is a small town located on the coast of Sindhudurg District of Maharashtra on the west coast of India. A very old Shri Dev Rameshwar Temple is located in this town which is dedicated to the Hindu deity Shiva.

Dr. Balasaheb Sawant Konkan Krishi Vidyapeeth has developed a Mango Research Sub Centre over an area of about 90 acres, that has developed hybrids like Ratna, a cross between the Alphonso and Neelam variety, as well as the Kesar hybrid. Rameshwar also has a large number of coconut palms in addition to kokum (Garcinia indica) to boot, and is the home of the famed Alphonso mangoes. Other fruits grown in the region are jackfruit, chiku and guava.

Etymology
The ancient Sanskrit name of the town, Rameshwar is one of the names used to refer to Lord Shiva. The town is named after Shiva and its temple - Shri Dev Rameshwar Temple, is located within the town boundaries.

Pujare of Rameshwar 

The original inhabitants of the region are the Pujare clan of the Maratha society. The temple rituals of Shri Dev Rameshwar Temple are performed by the Pujare. They are responsible for performing all the temple rituals, including Puja and Aarti, as well as taking care of the shivling and murtis. The Pujare act as counselors during Shri Dev Rameshwar festivities and festivals. They have a reputation for being learned and conduct prayer services for Lord Shiva.

In Maratha society, Pujare traditionally belonged to the priestly class in the Kshatriya community.

Shri Dev Rameshwar Temple

A temple dedicated to the Hindu deity Shiva is located within the boundaries of Rameshwar Wadi. It is a historic temple built in 16th century. Its chief interest is the approach about 250 yards long, cut through rock fifty feet deep. The idol, a four-armed figure seated on a bull, is of solid silver said to weigh a hundred kilograms and is in good condition at present.

A fair is held for six days in the month of Magha every year which is attended by about 5,000 people from nearby villages and towns. The fair starts 5 days before the day of worship.

Beaches and marine life 

The western side has two sandy and somewhat rocky beaches facing the Arabian Sea. One of them is towards the north near Vijaydurg and is located near the northern settlement of Ghariwadi while Rameshwar or Wafel Beach is to its south. Most of the fishing occurs on the northern beach as the water there is shallow and plentiful availability of marine life. Wade fishing is the most commonly used technique near this beach. The fishermen enter the water along with nets and fishing rods, avoiding use of boats due to shallow waters. The Wafel beach is deep towards the shoreline and is rarely used for fishing. Only  boats can be used here for fishing activities due to the strong inward current and depth of water even near the shore.

A wide variety of fish such as Indo-Pacific king mackerel (surmai), lady fish, pomfret, sting ray, hammerhead shark, puffer fish, mullet, great white shark, carp, eel, seer fish, swordfish and a rarely occurring sailfish are spotted here. Other than these fishes, aquatic mammals like dolphin, porpoise and whale are also found in the region and are quite commonly seen. Shellfish like lobster, clam, mussels, common periwinkle, oyster, crayfish and many types of crabs are also abundantly found in this area.

Flora and fauna 

Commonly found animals in and around the town include red fox, hyena, rabbit, mongoose, sea otter, barking deer, giant squirrel, langur and wild dog. Leopards, wild cats and tigers are very rarely seen in the area due to sparse vegetation. Domestic cows, bulls and buffalos are quite a common site in the town. Residents of the town use bulls for farming and collect milk from cows and buffalos. Common reptiles include various kinds of snakes and lizards. Birds other than crows, sparrows and pigeons, that are commonly sited in the town are barn owl, kingfisher, kite, cormorant, stork, egret, red-whiskered bulbul, pheasant, tern and cuckoo. Four species of crows exist in the region, of which jungle crow is the most commonly occurring species. Others are carrion, jackdaw and rook.

The entire region is very sparsely vegetated. A wide variety of grasses and weeds are found abundantly in the region. The most commonly found fruiting trees are mango, coconut, jackfruit, guava, chiku, ziziphus and garcinia. Most of these trees are grown in private plantations. Some of the flowering plants include chafa, hibiscus and calotropis which can be found in the wild.

Rameshwar Dockyard 

Rameshwar Dockyard, also known as Rameshwar Godi, is a tidal dockyard on the left bank of Waghotan river or Kharepatan Creek about 1.5 km from Vijaydurg Fort. The dockyard was built by Maratha Admiral Kanhoji Angre during  the 17th century and was re-modelled by Anandrao Dhulap to increase its capacity to hold ships of as  much as 500 tons. The length and width of the dock is 110 m x 75 m and the gateway is 7 m wide at its base and 11 m at the top without any gates. The bottom of the dock slopes upwards from the entrance. The wide base is designed to confer stability on the structure. The floor of the dockyard is made of lime mortar. This floor is now covered by a deposit of sediment more than 2 m thick. The dockyard currently lies just a few meters away from  a small Christian settlement. The occupation of the residents living nearby is mainly fishing.

Shri Sidhhapoorti Ganesh Mandir 
A temple dedicated to Hindu deity, Lord Ganesha was built in 2000. This temple was built by a local resident of Rameshwar Wadi. It is located in the western part of the Wadi which is known as "Vatar". Although the temple lies entirely in the private premises of its builder, it is open for outsiders. Various festivities and pujas are carried out in the temple throughout the year. There is no separate administration or a priest appointed in the temple, the owner takes care of all the maintenance and other matters of the temple building and its premises. The temple building is entirely made using red rocks and concrete. Its area is about 600-700 sq ft, while the front yard (angan) on the temple building is approximately of the same size. A small tulsi vrindavan (a sacred tulsi grove) is located at the right outer corner of the front yard. To the left of the temple, many flowering plants are grown. The temple itself is located within many trees.

Mango Research Sub Centre 

The Government of Maharashtra established a Mango Research Sub Centre at Rameshwar in 1978. It is an agricultural research station under the jurisdiction of Dr. Balasaheb Sawant Konkan Krishi Vidyapeeth (known as Konkan Krishi Vidyapeeth before 12 February 2001), Dapoli, District: Ratnagiri.

The region of Konkan is distinguished from the rest of Maharashtra State by virtue of its distinct agro-climatic conditions, soil types, topography, its location between the Sahyadri ranges and the Arabian sea, crops and cropping pattern, land holdings, and socio-economic conditions of the farmers. As such, the problems in agriculture and allied sectors are also entirely different from the other parts of Maharashtra. The Mango Research Sub Station at Rameshwar was built as part of the plan implemented by the Government of Maharashtra to conduct research on location specific problems and disseminate the improved crop production technologies among the farming community.

Gram Panchayat Rameshwar 
Rameshwar Gram Panchayat (Village Panchayat) was established on 17 January 1989. The number of members is 9 and are elected from 3 divisions (prabhaags).

Mahashivratri Fair
Every year, Mahashivratri is extensively celebrated in this village. A huge fair is held in and around the premises of Shri Dev Rameshwar Temple during this festive time. It is the night of worship of Shiva and occurs on 13th night/14th day of the Krishna Paksha or Dark Half of the month Magha according to the Hindu calendar. On this day, devotees observe fast and stay awake all night. Mahashivratri marks the night when Shiva performed the 'Tandava'. It is also believed that on this day Shiva was married to Parvati Ma. On this day Shiva devotees observe fast and offer fruits, flowers and Bael leaves on Shiva Linga. The fair lasts for six days and many devotees from surrounding regions as well as from across the state visit Shri Dev Rameshwar Temple during this festival. Huge processions are held during the festive night as well as the following day.

Maha Shivratri observances 
The following table shows some of the observances of Mahashivratri:

Transport 
Rameshwar is located on MH SH 115 which connects with NH 17 50 km away from the town. It is well connected to neighbouring towns and cities.

State transport 
MSRTC buses are available from all major towns as well as local buses that ply at regular intervals. Interstate buses of Goa State also ply from Panaji to Vijaydurg, which can be used to reach Rameshwar Wadi.

Driving directions 
From Mumbai: Distance - 431 km Time - 7 hours 44 minutes
From Pune: Distance - 353 km Time - 6 hours 50 minutes
From Kolhapur: Distance - 143 km Time - 3 hours 20 minutes
From Panaji: Distance - 182 km Time - 3 hours 31 minutes

Local transport 
The local transport is motorised three-wheeler rickshaws. They are parked near the main bus stop and these are available without much bargaining.

Railways stations 
Nearest railways stations are:
 Rajapur Road Railway Station: 62 km, 1 hour 30 minutes
 Vaibhavwadi Road Railway Station: 63 km, 1 hour 20 minutes
 Nandgaon Road Railway Station: 63 km, 1 hour 20 minutes
 Kankavli Railway Station: 74 km, 1 hour 45 minutes
Local motorised three-wheeler rickshaws are available from all the above listed railway stations or one can hire private cars that are parked outside. MSRTC Buses also ply between these stations and Vijaydurg, which can be used to reach Rameshwar Wadi.

List of trains halting at the above-mentioned railway stations:

Nearest airport 
The nearest airport is Dabolim Airport in Goa which is 207 km away. Other airports are Chhatrapati Shivaji International Airport, Mumbai (437 km) and Pune Airport (366 km). Another airport located nearby is Ratnagiri Airport, which is just 102 km from Rameshwar Wadi but currently, scheduled commercial air services are not available.

Places of interest 
 Shri Dev Rameshwar Temple
 Rameshwar Beach (Wafel Beach)
 Kalavshe Beach (Kolwadi)
 Rameshwar Dockyard (Godi)
 Hatti Mahal
 Sambhaji Angre Samadhi
 Shri Aday Durgay Temple
 Green Earth Eco-Park, Rameshwar
 Vijaydurg Fort
 Vijaydurg Beach
 Vijaydurg Port
 Dr. Balasaheb Sawant Konkan Krishi Vidyapeeth's Mango Research Sub Centre, Rameshwar(Girye)

See also 

 Shri Dev Rameshwar Temple
 Alphonso (mango)
 Pujare (clan)

References 

Cities and towns in Sindhudurg district
Tourist attractions in Sindhudurg district